Trachelospermum  star jasmine, Confederate jasmine, is a genus of evergreen woody vines in the dogbane family Apocynaceae, first described as a genus in 1851. All species are native to southern and eastern Asia.

They have long stems climbing to 12 m or more high in trees. The leaves are opposite, simple broad lanceolate to ovate, 2–8 cm long and 0.5–4 cm broad. The flowers are salverform (like those of Phlox), simple, 2.5–7 cm broad, with five white, pale yellow or purple petals joined at the base to form a tube.

The generic name Trachelospermum comes from the Greek, literally meaning "neck seed", and referring to the seed shape.

Despite its common name, the species is   not a "true jasmine" and not of the genus Jasminum.

Species

 Trachelospermum asiaticum (Siebold & Zucc.) Nakai - China (incl Tibet + Taiwan), Japan (incl Ryukyu + Bonin Islands), Korea, Indochina, Assam, Borneo, W Malaysia
 Trachelospermum assamense Woodson - Assam, Bhutan
 Trachelospermum axillare Hook.f. - China, Himalayas (N + E India, Nepal, Bhutan, Tibet), Thailand, Myanmar
 Trachelospermum bodinieri  (H.Lév.) Woodson - Tibet, Fujian, Guangdong, Guangxi, Guizhou, Hubei, Hunan, Sichuan, Taiwan, Yunnan, Zhejiang
 Trachelospermum brevistylum Hand.-Mazz.  - Anhui, Fujian, Guangdong, Guangxi, Guizhou, Hunan, Sichuan, Tibet
 Trachelospermum dunnii (H.Lév.) H.Lév. - Guangxi, Guizhou, Hunan, Yunnan, Zhejiang, Vietnam
 Trachelospermum inflatum (Blume) Pierre ex Pichon - Java, Sumatra
 Trachelospermum jasminoides (Lindl.) Lem.  Japan, Korea, Laos, Vietnam, Anhui, Fujian, Guangdong, Guangxi, Guizhou, Hainan, Henan, Hubei, Hunan, Jiangsu, Jiangxi, Shandong, Shanxi, Sichuan, Taiwan, Tibet, Yunnan, Zhejiang 
 Trachelospermum lucidum (D.Don) K.Schum. - Himalayas (N Pakistan, N + E India, Nepal, Bhutan, Myanmar, Thailand)
 Trachelospermum ninhii Lý - C Vietnam
 Trachelospermum vanoverberghii Merr. - Luzon in Philippines

Formerly included

 Trachelospermum anceps = Kibatalia macrophylla 
 Trachelospermum auritum = Epigynum auritum 
 Trachelospermum curtisii = Epigynum auritum 
 Trachelospermum difforme = Thyrsanthella difformis
 Trachelospermum esquirolii = Melodinus fusiformis 
 Trachelospermum laurifolium = Kibatalia laurifolia 
 Trachelospermum navaillei = Aganosma schlechteriana
 Trachelospermum obtusifolium = Anodendron wrayi 
 Trachelospermum philippinense = Micrechites serpyllifolius 
 Trachelospermum slootenii = Chonemorpha verrucosa
 Trachelospermum stans = Mandevilla foliosa
 Trachelospermum verrucosa = Chonemorpha verrucosa

Uses
Some species - notably T. asiaticum and T. jasminoides - are cultivated for their foliage and strongly-scented flowers.

References

External links
Trachelospermum jasminoides

Apocynaceae genera
Apocyneae